Mirambeau may refer to the following places in France:

Mirambeau, Charente-Maritime, a commune in the Charente-Maritime département
Canton of Mirambeau, a canton in the Charente-Maritime département
Mirambeau, Haute-Garonne, a commune in the Haute-Garonne département